The Millbrae Elementary School District is a school district in Millbrae, California. It consists of one middle school (Taylor Middle School) and four elementary schools (Green Hills School, Lomita Park School, Meadows School, and Spring Valley School).

See also 
 List of school districts in San Mateo County, California

References

External links
 

School districts in San Mateo County, California
Millbrae, California